Angor may refer to:

 Angor animi, a medical symptom
 Angor, a Senagi Papuan language
 Champions of Angor, a fictional superhero team in the DC Comics universe
 Angor, Uzbekistan, a town in Uzbekistan
 Angor, the nickname of Tom Clark of The Yogscast